The 47th Group Army was a group army (corps-sized formation) of the People's Liberation Army It was stationed at Lintong District, Xi'an, Shaanxi as part of the Lanzhou Military Region. It was disbanded in 2016-17, during the Chinese military reforms which had begun two years earlier.

The 160th Division was created in March 1949 basing on the 1st Training Division of Northeastern Military Region. The division became a part of 47th Corps. In August 1949 the division was disbanded.

Officers

Commanders
 Liang Xingchu: 1948-May 1949
 Cao Lihuai: 1949-1952
 Zhang Tianyun: 1952-1956
 Li Huamin: 1956-1960
 Yan Deming: 1960-1964
 Li Yuan: 1964-1975
 Hu Bohua: 1975-1980
 Zhang Defu: 1980
 Dong Zhanlin: 1985
 Qian Shugen: 1985-1992
 Guo Boxiong: 1992-1994
 Zou Gengwang: 1996-2000
 Chang Wanquan: 2000-2002
 Xu Fenlin: 2002-2003
 Peng Yong: 2003-2011
 Cao Yimin: 2011-2013
 Zhang Lianyi: 2013–present

Political commissars
 Zhou Chiping
 Li Renlin
 Liu Xianquan
 Chen Fahong
 Sun Zheng

References

Field armies of the People's Liberation Army
Lanzhou Military Region
Military units and formations established in 1949
Military units and formations disestablished in 2017